Francisco Guerra may refer to:

 Fran Guerra (born 2029), Spanish basketball player
 Francisco Guerra (bishop) (1587–1656), Roman Catholic bishop